Dearfield is a ghost town and a historically black majority settlement in Weld County, Colorado, United States. The town was formed by Oliver Toussaint Jackson, who desired to create a colony for African Americans. In 1910, Jackson, a successful businessman from Boulder, filed on the homestead that later became the town and began to advertise for "colonists." The name Dearfield was suggested by one of the town's citizens, Dr. J.H.P. Westbrook, who was from Denver. The word dear was chosen as the foundation for the town's name due to the precious value of the land and community to the town's settlers.

The first settlers of Dearfield had great difficulty farming the surrounding pasture and endured several harsh seasons. By 1920, the town had 200 to 300 residents, two churches, a school and restaurant. In 1921, the town's net worth was appraised at $1,075,000.

After the prosperous years of the 1920s, the Great Depression arrived and the town's agricultural success significantly declined. Settlers began to leave Dearfield in order to find better opportunities. By 1940, the town population had decreased to 12. Jackson desperately attempted to spur interest in the town, even offering it for sale. However, there was little interest in Dearfield. Jackson died on February 18, 1948.

A few deserted buildings remain in Dearfield:  a gas station, a diner, and the founder's home. In 1995, the town was listed on the National Register of Historic Places. In 1998, Black American West Museum in Denver began to make attempts to preserve the town's site. It is a Colorado Registered Historic Landmark.  A 2010 monument next to one of the remaining buildings contains information about the history of the site.

A 2001 state historical marker  at U.S. Route 85 mile marker 264 near Evans, Colorado, includes a panel with the history of Dearfield.

See also
National Register of Historic Places listings in Weld County, Colorado
Allensworth, California
Boley, Oklahoma
Nicodemus, Kansas

References

External links
University of Northern Colorado Libraries: Dearfield
Dearfield Colony listing in Colorado Preservation's Endangered Places Program
Dearfield African-American Farming Colony page at Colorado State University's Architectural Preservation Institute

African-American history of Colorado
Ghost towns in Colorado
Former populated places in Weld County, Colorado
Historic districts on the National Register of Historic Places in Colorado
Populated places established in 1910
Populated places established by African Americans
1910 establishments in Colorado
National Register of Historic Places in Weld County, Colorado
Populated places on the National Register of Historic Places in Colorado